Vinogradov is an impact crater in the Margaritifer Sinus quadrangle of Mars. It was named after Alexander Pavlovich Vinogradov, and the name was approved in 1979 by the International Astronomical Union (IAU) Working Group for Planetary System Nomenclature (WGPSN).

See also 
 Climate of Mars
 Geology of Mars
 Impact crater
 Impact event
 List of craters on Mars
 Margaritifer Sinus quadrangle
 Ore resources on Mars
 Planetary nomenclature

References 

Impact craters on Mars
Margaritifer Sinus quadrangle